Along Came a Spider is the eighteenth solo studio album by American rock musician Alice Cooper, released in July 2008 by Steamhammer/SPV. A hard rock/heavy metal concept album, it chronicles the activities of a psychopathic serial killer known as 'Spider' and the eventual undoing of his plans. A commercial success, it ended up becoming Cooper's highest-charting studio effort in the United States since Hey Stoopid (1991).

Background and release
The story-line for the concept album was first revealed on Cooper's radio show Nights with Alice Cooper. The theme of the album revolves around a "cool, calm and collected" serial killer known as 'Spider'. The police are baffled by the bodies of Spider's victims, which are cocooned in a silk web, and are each missing a leg. Spider's task is to collect eight legs to complete the construction of his own spider. However, things get complicated when he falls in love with his eighth victim. At the end of the album an internal voice is heard telling 'Spider' that 'We've been locked away here for twenty eight years Steven, we couldn't have done all those horrible things' thus revealing Spider as the character Steven from Welcome to My Nightmare.

Along Came a Spider was due for a 2007 release but problems with producer scheduling and tour commitments caused it to be pushed to mid-2008. Several demos and songs were prepared and short-listed during 2007 with further sessions for recording and writing taking place in February 2008. 75% of the album had been completed as of April 18, 2008. Cooper also planned to create a second part to the album, entitled 'The Night Shift,' but decided to make Welcome 2 My Nightmare instead.

Reception
The release has earned mixed to positive reviews from various publications. For example, music critic David Jeffries of Allmusic stated that, even though Cooper had produced better concept albums before, in Along Came a Spider the artist "fills his lyrics with clever and gruesome wordplay". A review from Blabbermouth.net praised the release as "yet another example of an album made by an elder rock icon that manages to sound fresh and relevant".

Track listing

As with a large portion of Cooper's back-catalogue being remastered and re-released through various distribution channels, Along Came A Spider has also received the same treatment. Re-released on CD in 2010, and distributed by Bigger Picture, it includes the three iTunes-only bonus tracks originally released alongside the album in 2008:

Music video 

Unlike Dragontown, The Eyes of Alice Cooper, and Dirty Diamonds, a music video was created to promote Along Came a Spider. Released on October 2, 2008, and directed by Rob Zombie bassist, Piggy D and Gabrielle Geiselman, the 10-minute-long music video stars Alice Cooper, Slash, Hazmat, Roxxi Dott, Howie Pyro, Dave Pino, Eric Singer and Peter Derek. It features a medley of three songs from the album: "Vengeance Is Mine", "(In Touch With Your) Feminine Side", and "Killed By Love".

Personnel 
 Alice Cooper – lead and backing vocals
 Danny Saber – lead guitar, bass, keyboards, backing vocals
 Greg Hampton – lead guitars, keyboards, backing vocals
 Chuck Garric – bass, backing vocals
 Eric Singer – drums

Guest musicians 
 Keri Kelli – guitars (5, 7 and 9)
 Jason Hook – guitars (5)
 Slash – lead guitar (2)
 David Piribauer – drums (8 and 10)

Charts

See also 

 Alice Cooper discography
 Fictional portrayals of psychopaths

References 

Alice Cooper albums
Concept albums
SPV/Steamhammer albums
2008 albums